The Drenica-Dukagjin Uprisings was a series of Albanian uprisings in Drenica and Dukagjin from 1919 to 1924. The uprisings began after the end of the first world war where Kosovo was annexed to the new Kingdom of Yugoslavia.

Background
Before the creation of the Independent State of Albania, Kosovo had been a center of Albanian Nationalism. In 1878 the League of Prizren was formed, a political-military organization of Albanian leaders which tried to defend Albanian inhabited lands. It was also the center of the Albanian revolt of 1910 and 1912. Despite having a 70% majority Albanian population, it had a 30% Non-Albanian(Mostly Serb) Minority, who wished to join the Kingdom of Serbia. Following the First Balkan War, the Treaty of London and Bucharest, Kosovo was given to Serbia and was Officially Annexed in 1918. Before and during the First World War, several Albanian uprisings would occur against the annexation of Kosovo by Serbia. After the end of the First World War, it was obvious that the Paris Peace Conference wouldn't accept the Albanian request to liberate Kosovo. On May 1, 1918, In Shkodra, the Committee for the National Defence of Kosovo was created to fight for the liberation of Kosovo from the newly formed Yugoslavia.

Events
On May 6, 1919 the Committee called for a general Uprising in Kosovo. This led to a large-scale revolt in Drenica involving around 10,000 people under Azem Galica. Despite the revolt being crushed, its brutal oppression would start several other Uprisings throughout 1920-1921. In November 1921 the League of Nations authorized the creation of the Neutral Zone of Junik, which included a couple of villages around Junik and the Highlands of Djakovica along the Kosovo border with Albania. The Zone would be used to supply the Kachaks and jeopardize the Yugoslavians. In late 1921 the Yugoslavian forces attempted to invade the Neutral Zone and Drenica but were pushed back by the Albanian forces under Azem Galica. It wasn't until the arrival of Ahmet Zogu in Albania by Yugoslavia in 1924, the assassination of the leadership of the Kosovo Committee, and the Death of Azem Galica on the battlefield that the  Neutral Zone and the Rebellions would come to an end.

Aftermath
Following the arrival of Zogu, the Committee of Kosovo, and other Albanian Nationalists, would be assassinated by Zogu's agents. Following the revolts, the Colonization of Kosovo would be intensified by the Yugoslav authorities and some 58,263 Serbian colonists would settle in Kosovo. It wasn't until the Second World War that Kosovo would be controlled by Albania, and during the occupation of Kosovo, 10,000-100,000 Serbians would be deported or forced to flee by the Albanian authorities. The revolts of Kosovar Albanians against the Yugoslav Authority would continue for some time until the end of the Kosovo War.

References

History of Albania
Drenica
History of Kosovo
History of Yugoslavia